William Albert Wilkins CBE (17 January 1899 – 6 May 1987) was a British Labour Party politician.

Wilkins was a linotype operator for a Bristol newspaper and was President of the Bristol branch of the Typographical Association. He joined the Labour Party in 1922 and became a member of Bristol City Council in 1936, serving for ten years. During World War II, Wilkins served as a stoker in the Royal Navy (in which he had served 1917–19) on the Q-ships of the Irish coast.

Wilkins was elected Member of Parliament (MP) for Bristol South in 1945, serving until 1970. He became an assistant whip in 1947 and in 1950 a Lord Commissioner of the Treasury. He was appointed CBE in the 1965 New Year Honours.

References

External links 
 

1899 births
1987 deaths
Labour Party (UK) MPs for English constituencies
Councillors in South West England
Commanders of the Order of the British Empire
National Graphical Association-sponsored MPs
Typographical Association-sponsored MPs
UK MPs 1945–1950
UK MPs 1950–1951
UK MPs 1951–1955
UK MPs 1955–1959
UK MPs 1959–1964
UK MPs 1964–1966
UK MPs 1966–1970
Royal Navy personnel of World War II
Typesetters
Ministers in the Attlee governments, 1945–1951